All the qualified teams qualify for the 2001 Little League Softball World Series in Portland, Oregon.

United States

Central
The tournament took place in Joplin, Missouri from August 1–6.

East
The tournament took place in Georgetown, Delaware from August 1–6.

South
The tournament took place in Toccoa, Georgia from August 3–7.

West
The tournament took place in Sunnyvale, California from August 5–8.

References

2001 in  sports in Oregon
Softball in Oregon